Nigali may refer to:
Nigali Band, a Village in Kanchanpur Nepal
Nigali, a settlement in Nepal
Nigali valley, on the border of Turkey and Georgia